Riachão do Jacuípe is a Brazilian municipality of Bahia state. It is a place in Sisaleira region, Microregion of Serrinha (Microrregião de Serrinha, in Portuguese).

References

Municipalities in Bahia